Žale Central Cemetery, often simply Žale, is the largest and the central cemetery in Ljubljana and Slovenia. It is located in the Bežigrad District and operated by the Žale Public Company.

History 
The cemetery was built in 1906 behind Holy Cross Church. The first burial was performed in the same year on May 3, when the priest Martin Malenšek was transferred there from the old Navje cemetery.

During World War I, many of the fallen soldiers of all sides were buried in Žale. However, they were all Roman Catholics, while Protestants, Jews and Muslims were buried in Navje. In 1923 the authorities allowed Jews and Muslims to be buried in Žale too, but only on the exterior side of the cemetery wall.

In 1931 the new part of the cemetery (B part) opened. The Italian military cemetery was arranged there and many Italian soldiers were reburied from the A part. At the same year the Jewish part of the cemetery was arranged too, however it was separated from the main part by a fence. In 1939 the Ossuary of World War I Victims was built by architect Edvard Ravnikar, where 5,258 of the victims of this war as well as of the associated conflicts were later buried.

With the growth of Ljubljana the need for graves was growing too. In the 1930s the cemetery was proclaimed the central cemetery of Ljubljana and the planning of its expansion began. As the plans of the architect Ivo Spinčič failed to please the authorities, in 1936 a new design was commissioned from the architect Jože Plečnik. The new part, named Plečnik Žale Cemetery, was completed in 1942. It is a special architecture with monumental entrance with big arch, with different small chapels and some additional buildings.

Until 1968, only coffin burials were performed in Žale, but in that year the Žale Crematorium was built and the urn burials became available too.

In 1974 with the construction of the C part, the cemetery expanded again. The C part was designed by the architect Peter Kerševan. In 1988 the D part (Nove Žale, New Žale) designed by Marko Mušič opened.

As of 2008 the cemetery measures 375,000 m2 and comprises sections A, B, and C east of Tomačevo Street, and section D west of the road. The fifth part of the cemetery, the Plečnik Žale, is not used for burials but for pre-burial ceremonies and associated cemetery activities. More than 150,000 people have been buried at Žale, about 2,000 of them prominent. The whole area of Žale has been proclaimed a cultural monument of Slovenia.

Notable people

About 2,000 prominent people are buried in the Žale cemetery, including:
 
 
Fran Albreht, author, editor and politician
Vera Albreht, poet
Vladimir Bartol, writer
Katja Boh, sociologist, politician and diplomat
Ivan Cankar, author and political activist
Fran Saleški Finžgar, writer and priest
Rihard Jakopič, painter
Davorin Jenko, composer, author of the music for the Serbian national anthem
Edvard Kardelj, Communist leader
Dragotin Kette, poet
Edvard Kocbek, poet, essayist and politician
Milan Komar, philosopher
Janez Evangelist Krek, politician
Dragotin Lončar, author, politician, historian
Janez Menart, poet
Josip Murn Aleksandrov, poet
Lili Novy, poet
Anton Peterlin, physicist
Leonid Pitamic, jurist
Jože Plečnik, architect
Rudi Šeligo, writer, politician and playwright
Dominik Smole, writer and playwright
Matej Sternen, painter
Gregor Strniša, poet
Jernej Šugman, actor
Josip Vidmar, literary critic
Milan Vidmar, electrical engineer, chess player and theorist
Angela Vode, politician, author, feminist activist
Gregor Žerjav, politician
Vitomil Zupan, writer
Oton Župančič, poet

External links

  The Garden of All Saints. 3D visualisation of Plečnik Žale by Boštjan Burger.
 360° views of Žale on Plečnik.net
 Architecture of Žale
 Search engine for graves in Žale

Buildings and structures in Ljubljana
Cemeteries in Slovenia
Religion in Ljubljana
Tourist attractions in Ljubljana
Bežigrad District
Jože Plečnik buildings